Victoria C. Honeyman (born 1978) is a British politics academic, and associate professor of British Politics at the University of Leeds.

She has a Ph.D. from the University of Leeds, and her thesis Richard Crossman: a critical biography (2005) was published as Richard Crossman: A Reforming Radical of the Labour Party by I.B. Tauris. She specialises in British politics and in particular on British foreign relations. She has written on foreign policy issues in The Independent and for UK in a Changing Europe.

She is a fellow of the Royal Historical Society.

Selected publications

References

External links

1978 births
Living people
Academics of the University of Leeds
Alumni of the University of Leeds
British political scientists
British women academics
Fellows of the Royal Historical Society